The Kazakhstan national under-21 football team is the national under-21 football team of Kazakhstan and is administered by the Football Federation of Kazakhstan.  The team competes in the European Under-21 Football Championship every two years.

UEFA U-21 Championship Qualification Record

UEFA U-21 Euro 2023 qualification

Current squad
 The following players were called up for the 2023 UEFA European Under-21 Championship qualification matches.
 Match dates: 4 and 10 June 2022
 Opposition:  and 
 Caps and goals correct as of:' 4 June 2022, after the match against 
 Names in italics denote players who have been capped for the senior team

Recent call-ups
The following players have also been called up to the Kazakhstan's squad in the last 12 months and are still eligible to represent.

Notes
Players in italics are still active at international level.
PRE Preliminary squad.
INJ Injured after call up to squad.
WD Player was withdrawn from the roster for non-injury related reasons.
SUS Player was suspended for the next match.

Managerial history
 Asian Cup 1998, World Cup 1999
  Vladimir Fomichyov (1998–99)
 EURO 2004-06 Qualification
  Oyrat Saduov (2004)
  Anton Shokh (2005)
 EURO 2006-07 Qualification
  Anton Joore (2006)
 EURO 2008-09 Qualification
  Juha Malinen (2007)
  Anton Joore (2008)
  Evgeni Yarovenko (2008)
  Bernd Storck (2008)
 EURO 2009-10 Qualification
  Anton Shokh (February/March 2009)
  Sergei Gorokhovodatskiy (Caretaker) (March/June 2009)
  Pavel Radnyonak (August 2009 - January 2011)
 EURO 2011-12 Qualification
  Slobodan Krčmarević (May 2011 – December 2012)
 EURO 2013-14 Qualification
  Sergei Borovsky (December 2012 – November 2013)
  Saulius Širmelis (2014/2015)
 EURO 2015-16 Qualification
  Vakhid Masudov (January/February 2016)
  Serik Abdualiyev (February/July 2016)
 EURO 2017-18 Qualification
  Vladimir Nikitenko (September 2017 – January 2018)
  Talgat Baysufinov (January 2018 – January 2019)
 EURO 2019-20 Qualification
  Alexandr Moskalenko (January 2019 – July 2020)
  Almas Kulshinbayev (July 2020 – December 2020)
 EURO 2021-22 Qualification
  Kairat Nurdauletov (December 2020 – current)

References

External links

 Page at UEFA website

 
European national under-21 association football teams
Asian national under-21 association football teams